Faroese people or Faroe Islanders are a North Germanic ethnic group and nation native to the Faroe Islands. The Faroese are of mixed Norse and Gaelic origins.
About 21,000 Faroese live in neighbouring countries, particularly in Denmark, Iceland and  Norway. Most Faroese are citizens of the Kingdom of Denmark, in which the Faroe Islands are a constituent nation. The Faroese language is one of the North Germanic languages and is closely related to Icelandic and to western Norwegian varieties.

Origins

The first known settlers of the Faroe Islands were Gaelic hermits and monks who arrived in the 6th century.

From the ninth century onwards the Norse-Gaels came and brought Norse culture and language to the islands. Little is known about this period, thus giving room for speculation. A single source mentions early settlement, the Icelandic Færeyinga saga. It was written sometime around 1200 and explains events taking place approximately 300 years prior. According to the saga, many Norsemen objected to the Norwegian king's unification politics and thus fled to other countries, including the newfound places in the west.

Historians have understood since the time of the Færeyinga saga that the Viking Grímur Kamban was the first settler in the Faroes. The Norwegians must have known about the isles before leaving Norway. If Grímur Kamban had settled sometime earlier, this could explain the Norwegians' knowledge of them. Another, more logical explanation might be that the Gaels of Scotland and Ireland told the Norwegians of the islands.

While Grímur is an Old Norse first name, Kamban indicates a Celtic origin. Thus he could have been a man from Ireland, Scotland or Isle of Man, where the Vikings already had settlements. Some place names from the oldest settlements on the Faroes suggest that some of the settlers perhaps came from the Scottish islands and the British coast.

Y chromosomes, tracing male descent, are 87% Scandinavian
but mitochondrial DNA, tracing female descent, is 84% Celtic.

See also

 List of Faroese people
 Demographics of the Faroe Islands
 Culture of the Faroe Islands
 Flag of the Faroe Islands
 Faroese Dane

References

Further reading

 Arge, Símun, Guðrun Sveinbjarnardóttir, Kevin Edwards, and Paul Buckland. 2005. "Viking and Medieval Settlement in the Faroes: People, Place and Environment". Human Ecology. 33, no. 5: 597–620.

 
Germanic ethnic groups
Norse-Gaels
North Germanic peoples